Bethel African Methodist Episcopal Church, Bethel AME Church, Greater Bethel AME Church or Union Bethel AME Church may refer to:

Arkansas 
 Bethel African Methodist Episcopal Church (Batesville, Arkansas)
 Bethel African Methodist Episcopal Church (Malvern, Arkansas)

California 

 Bethel African Methodist Episcopal Church (Sacramento, California)
 Bethel African Methodist Episcopal Church (San Francisco, California)

Florida 
 Greater Bethel AME Church (Miami, Florida)

Georgia 
 Bethel AME Church (Acworth, Georgia), listed on the NRHP in Cobb County

Indiana 
 Bethel AME Church of Crawfordsville
 Bethel African Methodist Episcopal Church (Franklin, Indiana)
 Bethel A.M.E. Church (Indianapolis, Indiana)
 Bethel A.M.E. Church (Richmond, Indiana)

Iowa 
 Bethel African Methodist Episcopal Church (Cedar Rapids, Iowa)
 Bethel AME Church (Davenport, Iowa)
 Bethel AME Church (Iowa City, Iowa)

Kansas 
 Bethel African Methodist Episcopal Church (Coffeyville, Kansas)
 Bethel A.M.E. Church (Manhattan, Kansas), listed on the NRHP in Riley County

Kentucky 
 Bethel AME Church (Shelbyville, Kentucky)

Louisiana 
 Union Bethel A.M.E. Church (New Orleans, Louisiana)

Massachusetts 
 Bethel African Methodist Episcopal Church and Parsonage, Plymouth

Mississippi 
 Bethel African Methodist Episcopal Church (Vicksburg, Mississippi)

Missouri 
 Bethel Chapel AME Church, Louisiana, Missouri

Montana 
 Union Bethel African Methodist Episcopal Church (Great Falls, Montana), listed on the NRHP in Cascade County

Nevada 
 Bethel AME Church (Reno, Nevada)

New Jersey 
 Bethel A.M.E. Church (Morristown, New Jersey)
 Bethel African Methodist Episcopal Church (Springtown, New Jersey)

New York 
 Bethel AME Church and Manse, Huntington
 Greater Bethel AME Church (Harlem, New York)

Pennsylvania 
 Bethel African Methodist Episcopal Church of Monongahela City
 Mother Bethel A.M.E. Church, Philadelphia, the founding church of the African Methodist Episcopal Church denomination
 Bethel A.M.E. Church (Reading, Pennsylvania)

South Carolina 
 Bethel A.M.E. Church (Columbia, South Carolina)
 Bethel African Methodist Episcopal Church (McClellanville, South Carolina)

Virginia 
 Third Street Bethel A.M.E. Church, Richmond

West Virginia 
 Bethel AME Church (Parkersburg, West Virginia)

See also
 Bethel Baptist Church (disambiguation)
 Bethel Methodist Church (disambiguation)
 Bethel Methodist Episcopal Church (disambiguation)